Kenneth Johnston (born 10 December 1934) is a Zimbabwean sports shooter. He competed in the men's 50 metre rifle prone event at the 1988 Summer Olympics.

References

1934 births
Living people
Zimbabwean male sport shooters
Olympic shooters of Zimbabwe
Shooters at the 1988 Summer Olympics
Place of birth missing (living people)